Uzma Jalaluddin is a Canadian writer and teacher, known for her 2018 debut novel Ayesha At Last.

Career 
Jalaluddin writes a column for the Toronto Star.  She is also a high school teacher, an occupation she shares with the protagonist of her first novel.  During an interview, her friend, fellow novelist, Ausma Zehanat Khan described their writing circle, which she called the Sisterhood of the Pen, that include Jalaluddin and S.K. Ali.  The trio of friends offer one another valuable advice, when they read one another's early drafts.

Jalaluddin described loving reading, and always wanting to write, but finding it hard to find novels about people who looked like her, and deciding to write one herself.  Jalaluddin had begun the novel when she was pregnant with her son Ibrahim, but only decided to finish the novel after telling seven-year-old Ibrahim about it.

In 2017 Jalaluddin was one of several women the Toronto Star interviewed, for their opinions on feminism and the future.
 
The popularity of Crazy Rich Asians, earlier in 2018, is said to have triggered a greater interest in Hollywood acquiring other novels from writers with an Asian background.  The film rights to Ayesha At Last were acquired by Amy Pascal's production company, Pascal Pictures.
Pascal Pictures acquired the rights in August 2018, less than four months after the novel's Canadian and UK debut.

Ayesha At Last was listed for the Toronto Book Awards, and was shortlisted for the 2019 Kobo Emerging Writer Prize, and longlisted for the Stephen Leacock Humour Award.  Hearst UK announces a Big Book Award, with each of its major publications naming one title. The novel has been favourably compared with Jane Austen's Pride and Prejudice. Cosmopolitan UK named Ayesha At Last as its 2019 choice, stating it is a clever homage to Jane Austen's Pride and Prejudice that you'll love, even if you never got round to reading the original.

In December 2019 Bustle asked noteworthy authors of first novels to recommend their favourite novels of 2019.  They selected Jalauddin, who recommended A Deadly Divide, a police procedural from her friend Ausma Zehanat Khan.

Her second novel,  Hana Khan Carries On, was published in June 2021.  The novel is about a rivalry between two competing halal restaurants.

References

External links
 
 

21st-century Canadian novelists
Canadian women novelists
Living people
21st-century Canadian women writers
1980 births
Toronto Star people
Canadian columnists
Canadian women columnists
Canadian schoolteachers
21st-century Canadian journalists
21st-century Canadian educators
21st-century women educators
Canadian women journalists